Bas 60 (Flygbassystem 60, Air Base System 60) was an air base system developed and used by the Swedish Air Force during the Cold War. The system was based around defensive force dispersal of aircraft and its supporting ground operations across many krigsflygbaser (wartime air bases) in case of war, primarily as a protective measure against nuclear weapons. The purpose of the system was to make it complicated for an opponent to destroy the Swedish Air Force on the ground and thus ensure endurance for the air force in a conflict scenario. The plan was to disperse the air units so one krigsflygbas would house one squadron (8-12 aircraft). This dispersion principle also applied to the individual wartime bases themselves, meaning that the various functions of an air base were spread over a large area in and around the base.

The system originated from an air force inquiry in 1954 and was formally implemented in the 1958 defence plan. The original plan called for 70 wartime air bases to be built, with 46 of them to be equipped for continuous usage. The number of bases was however reduced with every revision of the plan and about 40 bases ended up being completed.

During peace time the air squadrons were stationed at their respective air wing and deployment to the wartime air bases would only occur when the threat level increased. But many of the air wings also doubled as wartime air bases. The wartime air bases were only manned by a smaller bastropp (base troop) during peace time and the full base battalion would only be manned with a mobilization (except during certain exercises). This was because the majority of the units were made up by conscripts. The base system was therefore never fully active during the time it existed, like the rest of the Swedish Armed Forces during the Cold War.

A wartime air base in the Bas 60 system functioned as ordinarie bas (regular base), shortened as "O-bas" (R-base), for one or more type of aircraft; fighter, attack or reconnaissance. A regular base had the personnel and resources needed for maintaining and repairing the type of aircraft assigned to that base. Some bases also doubled as temporär bas (temporary base), shortened as "T-bas" (T-base), for one or more aircraft types. A temporary base only had capacity to refuel and rearm the type of aircraft it acted as temporary base for. All regular bases acted as temporary bases for fighter aircraft.

Road runways were also built to complement the wartime bases, acting as a backup bases. Civilian airports could also be used as a backup alternative.

The system was further developed into Bas 90 during the 1970s and 1980s.

Base layout

Main runway 
Visual aids for pilots such as runway lights were installed. At the ends of the runway there were raisable and lowerable nets for capturing aircraft that were not able to take off or land properly.

Framom - Fore flight line position 
Främre klargöringsområde (framom), fore flight line position, was the flight line position (apron) by the main runway, and was where fighter aircraft were to be prepared for missions and be on standby. A base usually had two framom positions, one located at each end of the main runway. One framom position had space for four aircraft. Attack and reconnaissance aircraft in need of complementary refueling could also be refueled at framom. Fighter aircraft on standby at framom were directly connected to the bases communication net so the pilots could receive orders directly and take off immediately after receiving the order. When no aircraft were at framom, the groundcrew would evacuate the area as a safety measure and return when new aircraft came in.

Bakom - Rear flight line position 
Bakre klargöringsområde (bakom), rear flight line position, was the flight line position for attack and reconnaissance aircraft. In case a base was a regular base for both attack and reconnaissance there were two separate bakom positions, referred to as bakom-attack (rear-attack) and bakom-spaning (rear-reconnaissance). This was to reduce the risk of having all aircraft destroyed in a single attack. The aircraft spaces could also be concealed with camouflage nets. Bakom was connected to the main airfield via a taxiway that in many cases was public road integrated into the base infrastructure, and aircraft could either taxi on their own between the sections of the base or be towed by a vehicle.

Uom - Staging area 
Uppställningsområdet (uom), staging area, was where aircraft undergoing long-term maintenance, such as repairs, or not being in immediate use were kept. A uom had field hangars for maintenance work and a site for engine swapping and testing. Just like at bakom the aircraft spaces at uom could be concealed with camouflage nets and was connected with the rest of the base via a taxiway that often was public road. Most of the aircraft groundcrew and their equipment would be positioned at uom.

Road runways and reserve bases 

To complement the ordinary Bas 60 bases, reservvägbaser (road runways) were built to act as a backup alternative. Selected sections of public roads that were suitable for the purpose were widened to give enough space for aircraft to take-off and land. One or two runway aprons were built near each end of the runway. About 30 road runways were built, primarily in the southern and eastern parts of Sweden. Usage of the road runways were limited by adverse light and weather conditions, which is why they were primarily considered a backup alternative. Utilizing a road runway required relocating units and resources from an ordinary base, and certain field works around the runway were often necessary before it could be used.

Selected civilian airports were later added as additional reserve bases.

Operations

Kommandocentral - Command centre 
The air traffic operations on a base were led and organized from a kommandocentral (command centre), abbreviated as KC, located in an underground bunker a few kilometers away from the airfield. A KC was manned by 6-8 people, including the duty officer.

TLF - The traffic leader at the field 
Trafikledaren vid fältet (TLF), the traffic leader at the field, was stationed at the main runway and assisted the air traffic operations. In case kommandocentralen was unavailable or stopped functioning the TLF could take over control of air traffic operations. The TLF operated from a special cart that was equipped with base radio, air traffic radio, telephone and controls for runway functions such as lighting.

Stabsplats - Command post 
The overarching and long term operations on base were led and organized from a stabsplats (command post). This command post would be located in one or more buildings (often a school) in a nearby town or city. The stabsplats also acted as the camp for many of the base units, including the medical, meteorology and security units.

Basbataljon 60 - Base battalion 
One base was operated by a basbataljon 60 (base battalion type 60), with the battalion chief in charge of the overall operations on the base. A fully mobilized battalion consisted of 1200-1500 men, but in peace time a base was normally operated by 2-3 technical officers and 10-15 conscripted flight mechanics. During larger exercises all or part of the full base battalion would be called in.

One base battalion consisted of the following units:
 Stabskompani (command company): command and administration of the base.
 Stationskompani (station company): aircraft groundcrew and maintenance.
 Intendenturkompani (commissariat company): supply and logistics.
 Flygfältsarbetskompani (field works company): base infrastructure repair and maintenance.
 Skyddskompani (security company): base security, removal of unexploded ordnance and fire fighting.
 Sjukvårdspluton (medical platoon): first aid and medical care.
The defense of the base could also be reinforced with infantry and anti-air units from the Swedish Army.

Further development 

In the 1970s and 1980s the Bas 60 system was developed into Bas 90 to accommodate new needs and threats.

Today 
With the end of the cold war the Bas 60 and Bas 90 system was scrapped, and many of the wartime air bases have been demilitarized and sold to civilian owners.

List of Bas 60 air bases

List of Bas 60 road runways 

The Bas 60 road runways are not to be confused with the short runways in the Bas 90 system, which in many cases also were built on public road. The Bas 90 short runways belonged to a larger air base and were therefore not counted as individual bases, unlike the Bas 60 road runways.

References

Books

Web

Swedish Air Force
Military aviation
Cold War